Yablonovy is a rural locality (a settlement) in Vyshnederevensky Selsoviet Rural Settlement, Lgovsky District, Kursk Oblast, Russia. Population:

Geography 
The settlement is located 36 km from the Russia–Ukraine border, 63 km south-west of Kursk, 17 km south-east of the district center – the town Lgov, 6 km from the selsoviet center – Vyshniye Derevenki.

 Climate
Yablonovy has a warm-summer humid continental climate (Dfb in the Köppen climate classification).

Transport 
Yablonovy is located 9 km from the road of regional importance  (Kursk – Lgov – Rylsk – border with Ukraine), 5 km from the road  (Lgov – Sudzha), on the road of intermunicipal significance  (38K-024 – Vyshniye Derevenki – Durovo-Bobrik), 0.5 km from the nearest (closed) railway halt Derevenki (railway line Lgov I — Podkosylev).

The rural locality is situated 63 km from Kursk Vostochny Airport, 129 km from Belgorod International Airport and 271 km from Voronezh Peter the Great Airport.

References

Notes

Sources

Rural localities in Lgovsky District